Denko Maleski is a Macedonian intellectual, diplomat, and professor at Ss. Cyril and Methodius University of Skopje.

Biography 
Maleski was born on 14 November 1946 in Skopje, then in FPR Yugoslavia. He is a son of Vlado Maleski, who wrote the lyrics of the Macedonian national anthem. Denko Maleski received his Master of Laws from the University of St. Cyril and Methodius in Skopje in 1977, then his PhD in International Relations from the University of Ljubljana in 1981. In 1985, he was elected Dean of the Faculty of Interdisciplinary Studies and Journalism at the University of Skopje. During 1990–91, Maleski was a visiting Fulbright professor at Bowling Green University in Ohio, USA. During 1998–99, he led a research program at the Woodrow Wilson Center for International Studies at Princeton University, USA. Denko Maleski was the first foreign minister of then Republic of Macedonia from 1991 to 1993, and ambassador to the United Nations, from 1993 to 1997. He is a professor at the Law Faculty at the University of Skopje and the director of the postgraduate studies of "International Politics and International Law". He is the author of numerous scientific publications, articles and essays. Maleski claims that the separate Macedonian nation was formed in the middle of the 20th century as an offshoot of the Bulgarian people:

References

Diplomats from Skopje
Academic staff of the Ss. Cyril and Methodius University of Skopje
Ss. Cyril and Methodius University of Skopje alumni
Ethnic Macedonian people
Living people
Year of birth missing (living people)